The Twins of Evil Tour was the first double bill concert tour co-headlined by American rock bands Rob Zombie and Marilyn Manson. Launched in support of each band's respective full-length studio LPs, 2010's Hellbilly Deluxe 2 and 2012's Born Villain, the tour visited stadiums from September 28, 2012, through December 12, 2012. It was conceived as a follow-up tour for Zombie's Hellbilly Deluxe 2 World Tour. At the time, Marilyn Manson was engaged in their worldwide Hey Cruel World... Tour, hence, Twins of Evil became a 'tour within a tour' for the band. It consisted of two legs covering concert dates in the United States and Europe.

The tour made headlines within the rock community due to a highly publicized altercation between the bands' respective lead vocalists. Despite this, both frontmen privately made amends and Twins of Evil became a critically and commercially successful double bill touring franchise that spawned two sequels, 2018's "Twins of Evil: The Second Coming Tour" with special guest Deadly Apples and 2019's "Twins of Evil: Hell Never Dies Tour".

Background and development
Following the conclusion of Rob Zombie's Hellbilly Deluxe 2 World Tour on May 26, 2012, Manson and Zombie underwent negotiations to launch a double bill tour to cover North America and Europe for the remainder of 2012. At the time, Manson was engaged in the worldwide Hey Cruel World... Tour in support of their 8th full-length studio LP, Born Villain, however, Manson was interested with the idea of touring with Zombie. Hence, the tour was conceived as a 'tour within a tour' for Hey Cruel World... Tour.

The tour began on September 28, 2012, in Phoenix, Arizona, at the first annual Desert Uprising Festival at Ashley Furniture Homestore Pavilion. The last show of the North American leg of the tour was on October 31, 2012, near Dallas. Marilyn Manson played in Latin America as part of his own Hey Cruel World... tour until the Twins of Evil tour moved to Europe on November 26, 2012. The tour concluded on December 12, 2012, in Bologna, Italy.

Incidents
A feud began between Manson and Zombie early into the tour. The day after the October 11, 2012 performance at the Allstate Arena in Chicago, Manson took to the social networking service Twitter and posted, "Sorry to Chicago for not getting to play 'Beautiful People.' You can sing it in between Zombie songs, his band has already played it."

The row then escalated the next evening during the tour's engagement at the DTE Energy Music Theatre in Detroit, Michigan. Manson came to believe that Zombie had deliberately cut into his set time and launched into a tirade saying, "I'm sorry if you came to see Rob Zombie, and he can't come on, because I'm going to beat his ass ... twice ... three fucking times." Zombie responded during their set by yelling several obscenities directed at Manson. His band then performed their rendition of the song "School's Out" by Alice Cooper and dedicated it to "the only real shock rocker there ever was, Alice Cooper, not some punk-ass bitch."

Zombie also addressed the issue in the social networking service Facebook where he wrote:

Return to Hey Cruel World... Tour
Marilyn Manson continued on their Hey Cruel World... tour at the conclusion of the Twins of Evil tour, playing in Yekaterinburg, Russia, on December 15, 2012, and December 16, 2012. This tour concluded in Los Angeles, on February 21, 2013.

Line-up

Marilyn Manson
Marilyn Manson: Vocals, additional guitar
Twiggy Ramirez: Guitar, backing vocals
Fred Sablan: Bass
Jason Sutter: Drums

Rob Zombie
Rob Zombie: Vocals
Piggy D.: Bass, Backing vocals
John 5: Guitar, Bass, Backing vocals
Ginger Fish: Drums

Tour dates

Cancelled or rescheduled shows

References
Footnotes

External links
 Official website

2012 concert tours
Co-headlining concert tours
Marilyn Manson (band) concert tours
Rob Zombie concert tours